The Industrial Bank of Kuwait was established in 1973 in the State of Kuwait by the Ministry of Finance, Central Bank of Kuwait and other large local industrial firms. Their primary objective is to nourish the local industry. Only 49.11% of the shares are currently owned by public authorities, namely the Ministry of Finance, the Central Bank of Kuwait and the Public Institution of Social Security.

See also
List of banks in Kuwait

External links
Industrial Bank of Kuwait

Banks established in 1973
Banks of Kuwait
Kuwaiti companies established in 1973